Antrim County may refer to 

County Antrim in Northern Ireland
Antrim County, Michigan, which was named after the county in Ireland.